Never Too Much is the debut solo studio album by American singer Luther Vandross, released on August 12, 1981, by Epic Records. Composed by Vandross himself, the album reached number 19 on the US Billboard 200 and number one on the Top R&B/Hip-Hop Albums chart, and has been certified double platinum by the Recording Industry Association of America (RIAA). Never Too Much earned Vandross two Grammy Award nominations in 1982, including Best New Artist and Best R&B Vocal Performance, Male.

The album's title track topped the Black Singles chart for two weeks. Vandross's rendition of Dionne Warwick's 1964 song "A House Is Not a Home" became one of his signature songs, and received attention for its transformation into an "epic", since its duration was extended to seven minutes. In 2020, the album was ranked number 362 on Rolling Stone's 500 Greatest Albums of All Time.

Critical reception

Allmusic editor Craig Lytle found that Never Too Much featured "one outstanding song after another. Vandross concocts a bouncy, vibrant flow on his up-tempo numbers and an intimate, emotional connection on his moderate grooves and his lone ballad [...] This is one of the better R&B albums of the early '80s."

Track listing

Personnel
Adapted from Allmusic.

Performers and musicians

 Luther Vandross – lead vocals, vocal arrangements, rhythm arrangements (1, 2, 3, 5, 6, 7), backing vocals (1, 3-6), arrangements (4), song arrangements (7)
Nat Adderley, Jr. – keyboards (1–7), rhythm arrangements (1, 2, 3, 5, 6), arrangements (4), backing vocals (4, 5)
 Ed Walsh – synthesizers (2, 4)
 Georg Wadenius – guitar (1, 2, 3, 7)
 Steve Love – guitar (3–6)
 Marcus Miller – bass (1–7)
 Anthony Jackson – bass (7)
 Buddy Williams – drums (1–7)
 Errol "Crusher" Bennett – percussion (1, 4, 5, 7), congas (4)
 Bashiri Johnson – congas (1, 2), percussion (2, 5)
 Billy King – congas (3, 5, 6)
 Paul Riser – horn arrangements (2, 5), string arrangements (2, 3, 5)
 Gary King – arrangements (4)
 Leon Pendarvis – string arrangements (6, 7), horn arrangements (7)
 Tawatha Agee – backing vocals (1–6)
 Michelle Cobbs – backing vocals (1, 2)
 Cissy Houston – backing vocals (1, 2)
 Yvonne Lewis – backing vocals (1, 2)
 Sybil Thomas – backing vocals (1, 2)
 Brenda White King – backing vocals (1, 2)
 Phillip Ballou – backing vocals (3–6)
 Fonzi Thornton – vocal contractor, backing vocals (4, 5)
 Norma Jean Wright – backing vocals (4, 5)

Technical

 Producer – Luther Vandross
 Executive Producer – Larkin Arnold
 Production Coordination – Sephra Herman
 Recorded and Mixed by Michael Brauer
 Engineer – Carl Beatty 
 Assistant Engineers – Lincoln Clapp, Andy Hoffman, Nicky Kalliongos, Gregg Mann and Don Wershba.
 Mastered by Greg Calbi at Sterling Sound (New York, NY).
 Art Direction – Karen Katz
 Photography – William Coupon

Charts

Weekly charts

Year-end charts

Certifications

See also
 List of Billboard number-one R&B albums of 1981

References

1981 debut albums
Albums arranged by Paul Riser
Albums produced by Luther Vandross
Epic Records albums
Legacy Recordings albums
Luther Vandross albums